Patricia Lockwood (born 27 April 1982) is an American poet, novelist, and essayist. Her 2021 debut novel, No One Is Talking About This, won the Dylan Thomas Prize. Her 2017 memoir Priestdaddy won the Thurber Prize for American Humor. Her poetry collections include Motherland Fatherland Homelandsexuals, a 2014 New York Times Notable Book. Since 2019, she has been a contributing editor for The London Review of Books.

She is notable for working across and between a variety of genres. "Your work can flow into the shape that people make for you," she told Slate in an interview in 2020. "Or you can try to break that shape." In 2022, she received the American Academy of Arts and Letters' Morton Dauwen Zabel Award for her contributions to the field of experimental writing.

Lockwood is the only writer with both fiction and nonfiction works selected as 10 Best Books of the year by The New York Times. At four years, she also holds the record for the shortest span between repeat appearances on the list.

Kirkus Reviews has called her "our guide to moving beyond thinking of the internet as a thing apart from real lives and real art,” and Garden & Gun: “goddess of the avant-garde.”

Early life 

Lockwood was born in Fort Wayne, Indiana. She has four siblings. Her father Greg Lockwood found religion while serving as a seaman on a nuclear submarine in the Cold War. His conversion first led him to the Lutheran Church, then to its ministry, and finally to Roman Catholicism. In 1984, he asked ordination as a married Catholic priest from then St. Louis Archbishop John May under a special pastoral provision issued by Pope John Paul II in 1980. Lockwood therefore had the unique experience of growing up in a Catholic rectory, with a priest for a father. Lockwood grew up in St. Louis, Missouri and Cincinnati, Ohio, attending parochial schools there, but never went to college.

Career 
"She married at 21, has scarcely ever held a job and, by her telling, seems to have spent her adult life in a Proustian attitude, writing for hours each day from her 'desk-bed,'" according to a profile in The New York Times Magazine. During that period, from 2004 to 2011, Lockwood's poems began to appear widely in magazines including The New Yorker, Poetry, and the London Review of Books.

Twitter 

In 2011, Lockwood joined Twitter and drew attention there for her comedy and poetics, including the ironic "sext" form she originated, her association with the Weird Twitter movement, and her devoted following. The Atlantic named Lockwood to its list of "The Best Tweets of All Time", where she was the only author included twice. In response to Lockwood's popular tweet ".@parisreview So is paris any good or not," The Paris Review has twice issued reviews of Paris.

Balloon Pop Outlaw Black 
In 2012, small press Octopus Books published Lockwood's first poetry collection, Balloon Pop Outlaw Black. The Chicago Tribune praised the work for its "savage intelligence." The collection was included in end-of-year lists by The New Yorker and Pitchfork and became one of the best-selling indie poetry titles of all time. Its cover features original artwork by cartoonist Lisa Hanawalt.

"Rape Joke" 

In July 2013, general interest website The Awl published Lockwood's prose poem "Rape Joke," which quickly became a viral sensation. The poem develops a personal experience Lockwood had at age 19 into a broader commentary on rape culture. The Guardian wrote that the poem "casually reawakened a generation's interest in poetry." The Poetry Foundation declared the poem "world famous." The poem was selected for the 2014 edition of The Best American Poetry series and won a Pushcart Prize. It has since been translated into more than 20 languages.

Motherland Fatherland Homelandsexuals 
In 2014, Penguin Books published Lockwood's second poetry collection, Motherland Fatherland Homelandsexuals. The book's cover features more original artwork by Hanawalt. The New York Times critic Dwight Garner praised the book for its "indelible, dreamlike details." Stephanie Burt, writing for The New York Times Book Review, lauded it as "at once angrier, and more fun, more attuned to our time and more bizarre, than most poetry can ever get." The Stranger dubbed Motherland Fatherland Homelandsexuals "the first true book of poetry to be published in the 21st century." Rolling Stone included Lockwood and the book on its 2014 Hot List and The New York Times named it a Notable Book.

Priestdaddy 

Riverhead Books published Lockwood's memoir Priestdaddy in May 2017. The book, called "electric" by The New York Times and "remarkable" by The Washington Post, chronicles her return as an adult to live in her father's rectory and deals with issues of family, belief, belonging, and personhood. In July 2017, Imagine Entertainment announced it had optioned Priestdaddy for development as a limited TV series. The memoir was named one of the 10 best books of 2017 by The New York Times Book Review, one of the best books of the year by The Washington Post, The Boston Globe, The Chicago Tribune, The Sunday Times, The Guardian, The New Yorker, The Atlantic, New York, Elle, NPR, Amazon, Publishers Weekly, among others, was a finalist for the Kirkus Prize, and was awarded the 2018 Thurber Prize for American Humor.  In 2019, the Times included the book on its list "The 50 Best Memoirs of the Past 50 Years," and the Guardian named it one of the 100 best books of the 21st century.

No One Is Talking About This 

Riverhead Books published Lockwood's debut novel, No One Is Talking About This, in February 2021. It was simultaneously released by Bloomsbury in the UK. The book follows an unnamed female protagonist's interactions with a virtual platform called "the portal." Writing for The New York Review of Books, Clair Wills praised the novel as "an arch descendant of Austen's socio-literary style — a novel of observation, crossed with a memoir of a family crisis, and written as a prose poem, steeped in metaphor." In The Wall Street Journal, Emily Bobrow called the novel "artful" and "an intimate and moving portrait of love and grief." It won the 2022 Dylan Thomas Prize, was shortlisted for the 2021 Booker Prize, and was one of the New York Times' 10 Best Books of 2021.

Essays and criticism 

Lockwood's essays and literary criticism, most notably in the London Review of Books, have been collected in The Best American Essays series and introduced works by authors including Virginia Woolf, Joan Didion, and Rachel Ingalls. The New Yorker has called Lockwood "a wizardly reviewer," and The Paris Review has celebrated her as "a cultural critic at the height of her powers." Praising her "fine thinking" and "purposeful comedy," The New York Times Magazines Wyatt Mason concluded, "Nothing will get you to read literary criticism" if Lockwood can't.

Personal life 
Lockwood contracted COVID-19 in March 2020, and as of February 2021 was still living with Long COVID symptoms.

She is married to Jason Kendall, "a journalist, designer, and editor." In May 2022, while they were traveling together for the Dylan Thomas Prize ceremony after a reading with David Sedaris, Kendall developed a cecal bascule in flight from Los Angeles to London and was rushed to Charing Cross Hospital, where he was treated and the cecal bascule spontaneously resolved before surgery.

Lockwood has acknowledged that much of the second part of No One Is Talking About This was inspired by real-life events surrounding her niece Lena, the first person ever diagnosed in utero with Proteus syndrome.

Bibliography

Fiction
No One Is Talking About This (Riverhead Books, 2021)

Nonfiction
Priestdaddy (Riverhead Books, 2017)

Poetry

Collections
Balloon Pop Outlaw Black (Octopus Books, 2012)
Motherland Fatherland Homelandsexuals (Penguin Books, 2014)
Penguin Modern Poets 2, Controlled Explosions: Michael Robbins, Patricia Lockwood, Timothy Thornton (Penguin Books, 2017)

List of poems

References 

1982 births
Living people
21st-century American poets
21st-century American women writers
21st-century American memoirists
American women poets
Poets from Indiana
Poets from Missouri
Poets from Ohio
The New Yorker people
American women memoirists
Writers from Cincinnati
Writers from Fort Wayne, Indiana
Writers from St. Louis
Weird Twitter